The mobile daughter card, also known as an MDC or CDC (communications daughter card), is a notebook version of the AMR slot on the motherboard of a desktop computer. It is designed to interface with special Ethernet (EDC), modem (MDC) or bluetooth (BDC) cards.

Intel MDC specification 1.0
In 1999, Intel published a specification for mobile audio/modem daughter cards.  The document defines a standard connector (AMP* 3-179397-0), mechanical elements including several form factors, and electrical interface.  The 30-pin connector carries power, several audio channels and AC-Link serial data.  Up to two AC'97 codecs are supported on such a card.

Several form factors are specified:

 45 × 27 mm
 45 × 37 mm
 55 × 27 mm with RJ11 jack
 55 × 37 mm with RJ11 jack
 45 × 55 mm
 45 × 70 mm

30-pin AMP* 3-179397-0 pinout

See also
 Daughter board

External links
 intel.com – MDC specification.pdf

Mobile computers
Motherboard expansion slot